Anthony Scyld Ivens Berry, known as Scyld Berry (pronounced "Shild", born 28 April 1954) is an English journalist and cricket correspondent of the Daily Telegraph. He was editor of Wisden Cricketers' Almanack from 2008 until 2011.

He was previously a cricket correspondent of the Glasgow Herald.

His father was the poet and critic Francis Berry.

References 

 Debrett's People of Today, 2009

External links 

 

1954 births
Living people
English sportswriters
English male journalists
Editors of Wisden Cricketers' Almanack
Cricket historians and writers